The University of the West of England (also known as UWE Bristol) is a public research university, located in and around Bristol, England, UK. With more than 30,000 students and 3,000 staff, it is the largest provider of higher education in the South West of England.

The institution was known as the Bristol Polytechnic in 1969; it received university status in 1992 and became the University of the West of England, Bristol. In common with the University of Bristol and University of Bath, it can trace its origins to the Merchant Venturers' Technical College, founded as a school in 1595 by the Society of Merchant Venturers.

UWE Bristol is made up of several campuses in Greater Bristol. Frenchay Campus is the largest campus in terms of student numbers, as most of its courses are based there. City campus provides courses in the creative and cultural industries, and is made up of Bower Ashton Studios, Arnolfini, Spike Island, and Watershed. The institution is affiliated with the Bristol Old Vic Theatre School and validates its higher education courses. Frenchay Campus and Glenside Campus are home to most of the Faculty of Health and Applied Sciences, with a further Adult Nursing cohort based at Gloucester Campus. Hartpury Campus provides training in animal sciences, sport, equine, agriculture and conservation.

History

Early foundations
The University of the West of England can trace its roots back to the foundation of the Merchant Venturers Navigation School in 1595.

In 1894, the school became the Merchant Venturers Technical College. The University of Bristol was formed just a few years after this, leaving the college for the foundation of UWE Bristol. The college was partly responsible for the creation of the Bristol College of Science and Technology (BCST) in 1960, which later gained a royal charter to form the University of Bath in 1965.

The technical college in turn became Bristol Polytechnic in 1970; the then-main campus was at Ashley Down, now a campus of the City of Bristol College.

Bower Ashton Studios was formed in 1969 as the West of England College of Art, which was formerly the art school of the Royal West of England Academy in Queens Road, Bristol. The St Matthias site (which is no longer owned by the university) was originally built in Victorian times and was a teacher training college. These campuses, together with campuses in Redland, Ashley Down, Unity Street and Frenchay became part of Bristol Polytechnic around 1976.

University status
The institution gained university status and its present name as a result of the Further and Higher Education Act, 1992. The Avon and Gloucestershire College of Health, which is now Glenside Campus, and the Bath and Swindon College of Health Studies joined in January 1996. Hartpury campus joined in 1997. The university is a lead academic sponsor of Bristol Technology and Engineering Academy, a new university technical college.

Rebrand

In the spring of 2016, UWE Bristol launched a rebranding campaign which introduced a new look to the university, with a new logo as part of the Strategy 2020.

Campuses

Frenchay Campus

UWE Bristol's largest and primary campus is named after the nearby village of Frenchay in the civil parish of Winterbourne. It is located 4 miles north of Bristol city centre, with Filton to the West and Stoke Gifford to the North.

In August 2006, a new sports centre was opened at Frenchay. In September 2008 UWE Bristol purchased the major part of neighbour Hewlett Packard's adjoining land, resulting in a  expansion to their existing  campus.

In 2012, major changes were introduced to the Frenchay campus at UWE Bristol. First, the Bristol Robotics Laboratory, the largest robotics laboratory in Europe, was opened and later on in the same year the UWE Bristol International College was opened to students. The International College provides international students with the necessary academic, subject-based and English language skills needed to successfully progress to a degree course at UWE Bristol.

The Students' Union opened its new building in 2015; it is two interlinked buildings bringing all Students' Union services together.

In autumn 2016 Future Space, a business incubator for hi-tech companies, was opened adjacent to the Bristol Robotics Laboratory on Frenchay Campus. It is one of only four universities in the UK to have a University Enterprise Zone providing space for over 70 businesses.

The new Bristol Business School building at Frenchay Campus was completed in 2017. It houses the Bristol Business School and Bristol Law School.

A new state-of-the-art, 4-storey engineering building with teaching and research facilities, located close to the new Bristol Business School in the heart of the Frenchay Campus, was opened to students and staff in June 2020. As of the 2021/22 academic year it has been put into use with state of the art laboratories, workshops and lecture theatres that cater explicitly to Engineering disciplines.

City Campus 
City Campus is made up of Bower Ashton Studios, Spike Island, Arnolfini and Watershed.

Bower Ashton Studios
Bower Ashton Studios is home to the creative and cultural subjects, which are part of the Faculty of Arts, Creative Industries and Education. Adjacent to the Ashton Court estate, on the edge of the city of Bristol, the West of England College of Art was established in purpose-built premises in 1969, moving from its previous location as the art school of the Royal West of England Academy in Clifton. In 1970 the college became part of Bristol Polytechnic, the precursor of the university.

Every year in June the campus houses a degree show attended by Bristol residents as well as friends and families of the graduating students.

Glenside Campus

Glenside Campus is the home of the Faculty of Health and Applied Sciences. It is located on Blackberry Hill in the suburb of Fishponds. The Faculty of Health and Applied Sciences (formerly the Faculty of Health and Social Care) was created in 1996 when the former Avon and Gloucestershire College of Health and Bath and Swindon College of Health Studies joined with the existing Faculty of Health and Community Studies at UWE Bristol. The Glenside Museum is situated within the campus.

The Faculty of Health and Applied Sciences includes the following departments:
 Department of Allied Health Professions
 Department of Applied Sciences
 Department of Health and Social Sciences
 Department of Nursing and Midwifery

It offers full- and part-time courses at all levels in the areas of Midwifery, Nursing, Occupational Therapy, Physiotherapy, Radiography, Social Work and other health-related professions.

Gloucester Campus 
Alexandra Warehouse is the Gloucester home of the Department of Nursing and Midwifery, Faculty of Health and Applied Sciences, at the University of the West of England (UWE), Bristol. It is located on West Quay in the Gloucester Docks. This campus delivers nurse training in the heart of Gloucester with UWE Bristol ~ Pre-registration Adult and Mental Health nursing; Return to Practice; Post-graduate and CPD courses. Alexandra Warehouse, a historic listed building, has been fully refurbished.

St Matthias Campus

St Matthias Campus was located in the suburb of Fishponds in Bristol. Built in the Victorian times by the Church of England, the campus has some Victorian Gothic buildings, set around a sunken lawn. St Matthias campus was home to various departments of the faculty of Creative Arts, Humanities and Education.

The University of the West of England closed the campus in September 2014 (with operations on the site ceasing on 4 July 2014) as a part of a relocation project. The various departments of the faculty of Creative Arts, Humanities and Education from St Matthias and Bower Ashton have moved to new facilities at Frenchay campus. In March 2014 it was announced that, subject to planning permission, the site would be sold and redeveloped by Barratt Developments for housing and the listed buildings would become a Steiner School.

Organisation and administration

Structure

The university is divided into four faculties which are then subdivided into departments:
 Faculty of Arts, Creative Industries and Education
 Department of Arts and Cultural Industries
 School of Art and Design
 Department of Education and Childhood
 School of Film and Journalism
 Bristol School of Animation (Affiliated School)
 Bristol Old Vic Theatre School (Associate School)
 Faculty of Business and Law
 Bristol Business School
Department of Accounting, Economics and Finance
Department of Business and Management
 Bristol Law School
 Faculty of Environment and Technology
 Department of Architecture and the Built Environment
 Department of Computer Science and Creative Technologies
 Department of Engineering Design and Mathematics
 Department of Geography and Environmental Management
 Faculty of Health and Applied Sciences
 Department of Allied Health Professions
 Department of Biological, Biomedical and Analytical Sciences
 Department of Health and Social Sciences
 Department of Nursing and Midwifery
 Hartpury College (Associate Faculty)
 Sport
 Equine
 Agriculture
 Professional
 Veterinary nursing

School of Art and Design

The School of Art and Design became part of the Faculty of Arts, Creative Industries and Education (ACE) following the university's reorganisation in 2010/11.  Adjacent to the Ashton Court estate in Bower Ashton, the West of England College of Art was established in purpose-built premises in 1969, moving from its previous location as the art school of the Royal West of England Academy in Clifton.

Among its principals and deans were the war artist Jack Bridger Chalker, the graphic designer Paul van Der Lem, and Paul Gough RWA, a researcher and art historian, who became the first pro-vice chancellor and executive dean of the former faculty in its expanded form of over 2,600 students.

Department of Education and Childhood
The Department of Education and Childhood (formerly the School of Education) is part of the Faculty of Social Sciences and Humanities. Its origins lie in teacher training colleges at Redland and St Matthias which became part of the former Bristol Polytechnic in 1969. The dean of the school is Ron Ritchie, who is also an assistant vice-chancellor of the university. A new purpose built home for the department was completed in 2000 for the department at the university's Frenchay campus.

The department offers undergraduate degrees in initial teacher education in early years education or primary education, as well as an education studies + PGCE (3+1) programme. Postgraduate Certificate in Education courses are offered as well as a range of professional development courses for teachers, further and higher education teachers and lecturers, and school support staff.

Coat of arms
Echoing Bristol's long connection with the sea and the Merchant Venturers' Navigation School, the top of the crest depicts a ship's mainmast and rigging. The flaming fire basket indicates guidance, hope and the desire for learning.

The shield at the centre is adapted from that of the College of St Matthias with the wavy line representing the rivers of Avon and Severn. The unicorn is taken from the arms of the City of Bristol and the sea stag from those of the former County of Avon. Both these creatures wear a crown of King Edgar around their necks. Edgar is regarded as a local monarch because he was crowned in Bath Abbey in 973. The wavy lines enclosed in circles on the shoulders represent the fountain of knowledge and learning.

The unicorn and sea stag each support an apple tree, known as the tree of knowledge and is taken from the coat of arms of the Council for National Academic Awards which used to authorise degrees awarded to students of Bristol Polytechnic.

The motto Light, Liberty, Learning is a Disraeli quotation and corresponds directly to the symbolism of the coat of arms. The fire basket represents the Light, the Bristol and Avon supporters represent liberty, and the trees of knowledge and learning.

Academic profile

League tables

UWE Bristol was ranked within the top 25 universities in the UK by The Guardian University Guide 2021. UWE Bristol is only one of four universities in the UK to have a University Enterprise Zone providing space for over 70 businesses, and the largest UK robotics lab.

The 2018 Teaching Excellence Framework, a government assessment of the quality of undergraduate teaching in universities, awarded the university with a Gold rating. In 2017, UWE Bristol was ranked as one of the top 150 universities in the world under 50 in THE Times' ranking. In 2019, it ranked 464th among the universities around the world by SCImago Institutions Rankings.

Ofsted reports have rated UWE Bristol's primary, secondary and further education initial teacher training (ITT) courses as good.

Research
The volume of world-leading research at UWE Bristol has gone up by 170%, according to the results of the Research Excellence Framework (REF) 2014. The REF 2014 results reveal that 57 percent of the research submitted by UWE Bristol was judged to be either world leading or internationally excellent. The results highlight UWE Bristol's particular strengths in the areas of allied health and nursing, and communications, cultural and media studies. Results were also outstanding in areas such as architecture, built environment and planning; engineering; art and design; computer science; and business and management.

In 2010, UWE Bristol launched a research repository in order to host electronic versions of the research of its academics. The UWE Bristol Research Repository is open access.

Bristol Robotics Laboratory and Future Space
Bristol Robotics Laboratory (BRL), the largest robotics laboratory of its type in the UK was officially opened on 10 May 2012 by David Willetts, Minister for Universities and Science. The laboratory is a partnership between University of the West of England (UWE) and the University of Bristol.

According to EE/Times, it is the largest robotics laboratory in Europe. The BRL is home to a community of 70 academics and businesses who are leading current thinking in nouvelle and service robotics, intelligent autonomous systems and bio-engineering. Over £1.65 million has been spent on the new facilities. The total area of the BRL is circa 2,400 m2, with over 300 square metres of specialised laboratory space and two Flying Arenas.

Future Space is a business incubator adjacent to the Bristol Robotics Laboratory, in a former Hewlett Packard factory building which was bought by UWE Bristol in 2015 and converted. It can house up to 70 hi-tech startup companies and early-stage companies. It is the £16.5 million realisation of the West of England University Enterprise Zone (UEZ), one of four UEZs supported by the UK government, which were initially announced by Chancellor George Osborne in 2014. The main areas of focus of the UEZ are robotics, biotechnology and biomedicine. It is a collaboration with the West of England Local Enterprise Partnership and the University of Bristol, supported by South Gloucestershire Council, the University of Bath and the West of England Academic Health Science Network. Future Space opened in autumn 2016.

National College for Legal Training
The National College of Legal Training (NCLT) is a collaboration between UWE Bristol and Central Law Training, launched in January 2010 to provide postgraduate legal training. NCLT Study centres are located at Coventry University, Manchester Metropolitan University, Southampton Solent University and University of Westminster.

The Bristol Distinguished Address Series

Based at the University of the West of England Campus in Frenchay the series of lectures provide a unique opportunity to hear about the challenges, issues and decisions being made at the highest level of strategic leadership. These free public lectures bring top level business leaders to Bristol.  The conference covers a wide range of topics including business, technology & innovation, science and local & global issues.

Student life

Students' Union

The Students' Union at UWE, formerly UWE Students' Union (‘UWESU’), is based at Frenchay campus and was established in 1971. It is run by a team of five sabbatical officers, who are elected annually from the student population. The new Students' Union building was completed in Summer 2015 and operates a bar, a coffee shop and two convenience stores at Frenchay Campus. A Students' Union bar and shop is also available at Glenside Campus and Bower Ashton Studios. The student radio station, Hub Radio operates out of a studio on campus.

Student accommodation
In September 2006, Frenchay Student Village opened providing on-campus accommodation for 1,932 students, adding to the 252 units already provided in Carroll Court.  Campus accommodation is also provided at Glenside. In partnership with UNITE Student Housing a further 1,500 places are provided in Bristol City Centre and UWE Bristol Accommodation services also places students in vetted private rentals. All accommodation at UWE is self-catering.

In September 2014, Wallscourt Park opened on Frenchay Campus.
Following the 2020–21 academic year, Carroll Court was knocked down and construction began on new accommodation in its place in order to accommodate extra students.

The main halls of residence are:

Student Village – Frenchay Campus
 Brecon Court 
 Cotswold Court
 Mendip Court 
 Quantock Court 
Frenchay Campus
 Ashley Village (demolished around 2005 to make way for the S Block)
 Carroll Court (demolished in 2022 to make way for new accommodations) 
 Wallscourt Park 
Glenside Campus
 Glenside (on Glenside campus)
 The Hollies (opposite Glenside Campus)
Bristol City Centre
 Marketgate (owned by Unite Group)
 Nelson and Drake House (owned by Unite Group)
 Blenheim Court (owned by Unite Group)
 Phoenix Court (owned by Unite Group)
 Transom House (owned by Host students)

Sport
The University of the West of England Boat Club is the rowing club belonging to the university.

Notable alumni

 Silas Adekunle – entrepreneur
 Angellica Bell – BBC Politics, TV and radio presenter
 Helen Blaby – BBC radio reporter, newspaper columnist
 Samantha Cameron – business executive, wife of David Cameron
 Ian Cognito – comedian
 Paul Coldwell – artist
 David Fisher – artist
 Bear Grylls – English adventurer and TV presenter
 Larry Godfrey – Olympic archer
 Peter J. Hall (1926–2010), costume designer for the Dallas Opera.
 Miranda Hart – comedian
 Russell Howard – comedian
 Myles Jackman – lawyer
 CY Leung – Vice Chairman of the National Committee of the Chinese People's Political Consultative Conference
  Lee Chee Leong – Malaysian Deputy Home Minister
 Lady Davina Lewis – member of British Royal Family
 Richard Long – sculptor
 Kate Malone – studiopotter
 Jamie Oliver – keyboardist of Welsh rock band Lostprophets
 Dawn Primarolo – Labour Party Member of Parliament
 Pete Reed – Olympic rower
 Seyi Rhodes – television presenter and investigative journalist
 Jack Russell – cricketer
 Christopher Sadler – animator director, who works with Aardman Animations
 Simon Shaw – rugby union England international
 Hugo Southwell – rugby union Scotland international
 Marko Stanojevic – rugby union Italy international
 Shirley Teed – artist
 Teo Nie Ching – Malaysian Democratic Action Party Member of Parliament
 Dominic Waghorn – U.S. correspondent of Sky News
 Tim Atkins - Scotland hockey player
 Simon Carroll - Studio potter

Notable faculty 

 Alison Assiter, professor of feminist theory
 Victoria Clarke
 Richard Coates
 Owen Holland
 Aaron Schuman
 Peter Howells
 Stephen J. Hunt
 Julie Kent
 Howard Newby
 Steven West

See also
 Armorial of UK universities
 List of universities in the UK
 Post-1992 universities

Notes

References

External links 

 University of West of England website
 Students' Union website
 UWE Research Repository

 
Educational institutions established in 1970
1970 establishments in England
University of the West of England
University Alliance
Universities UK